Silverstream is a suburb of Upper Hutt in New Zealand, just under 7 km south-west of the Upper Hutt CBD.  It is in the lower (southern) part of the North Island of New Zealand at the southern end of Upper Hutt, close to the Taitā Gorge, which separates Upper Hutt from Lower Hutt. The area is sited at the mouth of a small valley formed by the Wellington Region's tectonic activity and, in part, by Hull's Creek, which discharges into the Hutt River.

Demographics

Silverstream had a population of 3,531 at the 2018 New Zealand census, an increase of 267 people (8.2%) since the 2013 census, and an increase of 210 people (6.3%) since the 2006 census. There were 1,266 households. There were 1,743 males and 1,791 females, giving a sex ratio of 0.97 males per female. The median age was 42.8 years (compared with 37.4 years nationally), with 693 people (19.6%) aged under 15 years, 573 (16.2%) aged 15 to 29, 1,674 (47.4%) aged 30 to 64, and 594 (16.8%) aged 65 or older.

Ethnicities were 88.9% European/Pākehā, 8.2% Māori, 3.6% Pacific peoples, 6.3% Asian, and 2.5% other ethnicities (totals add to more than 100% since people could identify with multiple ethnicities).

The proportion of people born overseas was 20.4%, compared with 27.1% nationally.

Although some people objected to giving their religion, 44.9% had no religion, 46.4% were Christian, 0.9% were Hindu, 0.3% were Muslim, 0.3% were Buddhist and 1.9% had other religions.

Of those at least 15 years old, 909 (32.0%) people had a bachelor or higher degree, and 315 (11.1%) people had no formal qualifications. The median income was $44,100, compared with $31,800 nationally. The employment status of those at least 15 was that 1,530 (53.9%) people were employed full-time, 396 (14.0%) were part-time, and 99 (3.5%) were unemployed.

Transport 
Silverstream is on the Hutt Valley section of the Wairarapa railway line, operated by Metlink.  The area has a station on this line; the Silverstream Railway Station.  A deviation of the Wairarapa line was opened in 1954 original Wairarapa Line in Silverstream over the Hutt River. The original section of the line is now owned by the Silver Stream Railway.

Education

Silverstream School

The school has 22 classes, with three separate school syndicates: Ako Iti (Years 1 and 2), Ako Whanake (Years 3 and 4) and Ako Nui (Years 5 and 6). It takes part in ICAS mathematics and English competitions and the Otago Problem Solving challenge, and has its own small choir and orchestra.

Between 2007 and 2010, the school underwent extensive renovations.

The school grounds are sometimes used for events, such as running races and meetings.

Private schools

Other education

Silverstream is zoned for Fergusson Intermediate and Upper Hutt College.

It also has a kindergarten for children aged 3 to 4.

Notable people

Beverly Morrison, known as "Beaver", a jazz singer educated at Silverstream School

References

Suburbs of Upper Hutt
Populated places on Te Awa Kairangi / Hutt River